Pleckstrin homology-like domain family B member 1 is a protein that in humans is encoded by the PHLDB1 gene.

The first PHLDB1 cDNA was cloned from a rat pituitary cDNA library and named as LL5 after the clone number.

References

Further reading